Jennifer Witcher (known as DJ Minx) is a house and techno DJ and Producer born in Detroit, founder of the DJ collective 'Women on Wax', and accompanying record label 'Women on Wax Recordings'.

Biography

Life 
Witcher was born in Detroit in 1967, the youngest sibling of five children. In June 2021, as part of Pride month, Witcher came out as a lesbian.

Career 
Witcher began DJing in the 1990s, after witnessing established DJs perform at Detroit's Music Institute.

She engineered and hosted the electronic music show ‘Deep Space Radio’, on WGPR (Detroit), and hosted the University of Canada weekly radio programme ‘Steamy Windows’ on CJAM 91.5 FM. She went on to become a resident of Club Motor in Hamtramck. Witcher performed at the first Detroit Electronic Music Festival in 2000, has performed at every edition of the Detroit techno festival 'Movement', and tours internationally.

In 2001 Witcher began producing, first resulting in the 'Introduction' EP, followed by 'Airborne' in 2001, a four-tracker which included the track 'A Walk In The Park'. In 2003 ‘A Walk In The Park’ was re-released in 2004 by Richie Hawtin’s label ‘Minus’. It went on to be remixed by several other DJs.

In 2015 Mixmag named her as one of the 20 women who have shaped the history of Dance Music, and in 2016 Time Out New York named her one of the “Best house music DJs of all time”. In 2018 she was awarded the ‘Spirit of Detroit’ award, by the City of Detroit.

In 2020 Witcher launched the online clothing store Behind The Grüv.

Women on Wax 
In 1996 Witcher founded the DJ collective 'Women on Wax'- a platform for female DJs from Detroit.

In 2001 she established the record label ‘Women on Wax Recordings’. Witcher went on to create a sub-imprint of the label called W.O.W. B.A.M. (Women On Wax Bangin’ Ass Music), and collaborates and produces on other labels.

References

External links 
 DJ Minx at Women on Wax Recordings
 DJ Minx at Soundcloud

African-American DJs
Women DJs
Living people
American electronic musicians
American techno musicians
American house musicians
House musicians
House DJs
Club DJs
DJs from Detroit
Year of birth missing (living people)
21st-century African-American people
American lesbian musicians